The Land Trust of Virginia (LTV) was originally formed in 1991 as the first statewide nonprofit land trust in the Commonwealth of Virginia. LTV uses a legal tool called a conservation easement to help landowners voluntarily protect scenic, historic or environmentally sensitive lands while keeping the land in private ownership and open for compatible uses, including forestry, farming, recreation and limited residential uses.

The Land Trust of Virginia is headquartered near Middleburg, Virginia and has protected more than 151 properties and 16,049 acres (40 km2) throughout the state.  The greatest density of easements are in Loudoun and Fauquier Counties, but LTV also holds easements in Clarke, Rappahannock, Culpeper, Madison, Hanover, and Green Counties.  In 2009, the Land Trust of Virginia was accredited by the Land Trust Accreditation Commission, an independent program of the national Land Trust Alliance. The Land Trust of Virginia is one of the first 54 land trusts in the nation – and the second in Virginia - to receive such a designation.

References

External links

Land trusts in Virginia
Organizations established in 1991
1991 establishments in Virginia